The Carlos Palanca Memorial Awards for Literature winners in 1961 (rank, title of winning entry, name of author).


English division
Short story
First prize: "The Sound of Sunday" by Kerima Polotan Tuvera
Second prize: "The Day the Dancers Came" by Bienvenido Santos
Third prize: "Adios Ossimandas" by Wilfrido D. Nolledo

One-act play
First prize: "Longer Than Mourning" by Jesus T. Peralta
Second prize: "The Celebrants" by Julian E. Dacanay Jr.
Third prize: "Amour Impossible" by Wilfrido D. Nolledo

Filipino (Tagalog) division
Short story in Filipino
First prize: "Parusa" by Genoveva Edroza-Matute
Second prize: "Binhi" by Clodualdo Del Mundo Jr.
Third prize: "Mabangis Na Lungsod" by Efren Reyes Abueg

One-act play in Filipino
First prize: "Magkabilang Mukha ng Isang Bagol" by Amado V. Hernandez
Second prize: "Ikalawang Mukha ng Paninindigan" by Fernando L. Samonte
Third prize: "Mga Kaawa-awa" by Buenaventura S. Medina Jr.

More winners by year

References
 

1961
1961 literary awards